Sazlıpınar is a village in the Erzincan District, Erzincan Province, Turkey. The village is populated by Kurds of the Keçelan tribe and had a population of 109 in 2021.

References 

Villages in Erzincan District
Kurdish settlements in Erzincan Province